Lydia Madero García (born 21 July 1950) is a Mexican politician affiliated with the National Action Party. She served as Senator of the LVIII and LIX Legislatures of the Mexican Congress representing Tamaulipas and as Deputy of the LV Legislature. At the state level, she served in the LVI Legislature of the Congress of Tamaulipas.

References

1950 births
Living people
Politicians from Monterrey
Women members of the Senate of the Republic (Mexico)
Members of the Senate of the Republic (Mexico)
Members of the Chamber of Deputies (Mexico)
National Action Party (Mexico) politicians
20th-century Mexican politicians
20th-century Mexican women politicians
21st-century Mexican politicians
21st-century Mexican women politicians
Women members of the Chamber of Deputies (Mexico)
Autonomous University of Tamaulipas alumni
University of Texas alumni
Members of the Congress of Tamaulipas